Centaurodendron is a genus of flowering plant in the family Asteraceae. The entire genus is endemic to the Juan Fernández Islands in the southern Pacific Ocean, part of the Republic of Chile.

 Species
 Centaurodendron dracaenoides Johow - Juan Fernández Islands
 Centaurodendron palmiforme Skottsb. - Juan Fernández Islands

References

 
Asteraceae genera
Flora of the Juan Fernández Islands
Endemic flora of Chile
Taxonomy articles created by Polbot